Boże refers to the following places in Poland:

 Boże, Masovian Voivodeship
 Boże, Warmian-Masurian Voivodeship